Fred Nicole (born 21 May 1970) is a Swiss rock climber known for his first ascents of extreme sport climbing routes, and also for pioneering the development of standards and techniques in modern bouldering in the 1990s and early 2000s; he is considered an important climber in the history of the sport.

Climbing career

In 1992, Nicole solved La Danse des Balrogs, in Branson, Switzerland, which is considered the first-ever   in bouldering history.  In 1996, he solved Radja, also in Branson, which is also now considered the first-ever   graded boulder in history.  

In 2002, he solved Monkey Wedding and Black Eagle SDS in Rocklands, South Africa, which is now considered to be the first-ever   graded boulder in history. In 2000, Nicole solved  in Cresciano in Switzerland, which at the time was considered the first-ever  boulder in history, but its consensus grade was subsequently softened; the beauty and challenge of Dreamtime have maintained its status as an important route in bouldering history.

Nicole has also made important first ascents in sport climbing. In 1988, he redpointed the second-ever  in history with Anaïs et le canabis in Saint-Loup in Switzerland.

See also 
List of grade milestones in rock climbing
History of rock climbing

References

External links
 VIDEO: Nicole adds two test-pieces, Terre de Sienne and El Techo de los Tres B, Climbing (7 April 2005)

 VIDEO: Witness the Fitness, Fred Nicoles Story, Climbing (5 January 2007)
 VIDEO: Fred Nicole: Why He Climbs, Climbing (11 April 2013)

Swiss rock climbers
Living people
1970 births
Boulder climbers